Jan-Olav Ingvaldsen  (12 January 1954 – 5 April 2021) was a Norwegian politician.

He was born in Fauske to Albin I. Ingvaldsen and Gunvor M. Petersen. He was elected representative to the Storting for the period 1985–1989 for the Labour Party.

Ingvaldsen died on 5 April 2021, at 67 years old.

References

1954 births
2021 deaths
People from Fauske
Labour Party (Norway) politicians
Members of the Storting